Céline Naef (born 25 June 2005) is a Swiss tennis player.

Naef has career-high WTA rankings of 323 in singles, achieved on 30 January 2023, and 832 in doubles, reached on 30 January 2023. Up to date, she has won five singles and two doubles titles at tournaments of the ITF Circuit.

Junior years
Naef had a successful junior career. Her career-high ranking as a junior was world No. 4. In 2012, Naef won a prestigious tournament for juniors Trofeo Bonfiglio (Grade A) In 2022, Naef reached the final of the 2022 French Open, partnering Nikola Bartůňková.In July 2022, he played in the final of the European Youth Championship held in Klosters, Switzerland. lost to Victoria Jiménez Kasintseva from Andorra in the final.

Career
Naef played and won her first final in Monastir, Tunisia, in March 2022.October 2022 became champion in both singles and doubles in Reims, France.A week later, she won another singles title in Cherbourg-en-Cotentin.She defeated Spanish player Irene Burillo Escorihuela in the final.

Naef started 2023 with a win. In the tournament held in Loughborough, England, she became the champion by defeating British Eliz Maloney in the final.February 2023 naef played their first major final. She became the champion in both singles and doubles at the ITF40W tournament held in Porto, Portugal.

Junior Grand Slam tournament finals

Girls' doubles: 1 (runner-up)

ITF finals

Singles: 5 (5 titles, 0 runner–ups)

Doubles: 2 (2 titles, 0 runner–ups)

References

External links
 
 

2005 births
Living people
Swiss female tennis players
21st-century Swiss women